Chaupal (Hindi-Urdu: चौपाल or چوپال), or Chopal, can refer to:

Chaupal (public space), a community building or space in the rural areas of North India and Pakistan
Chaupal, Himachal Pradesh, a town in Himachal Pradesh, India
Chopala, a town in Punjab province, Pakistan
Chaupal, a Dalit Hindu caste